Praktiseer is a town in Sekhukhune District Municipality in the Limpopo province of South Africa.

It is made up of 5 sub-sections namely: Shushumela (written as Šušumela) extension 1, extension 2, Dark City, and Kasi,sikiring and lately Tswelopele park 

Praktiseer has a public health clinic situated in Kasi,4 primary schools namely Bogwasha, Itirele, Koboti and Batubatse, two public high schools (Kweledi Secondary School and Leolo High School) and a private high school, Ntlhahlole. It is also a home to a TVET college Sekhukhune FET college formerly known as Dr. C.N Phatudi college of education.

References

Populated places in the Fetakgomo Tubatse Local Municipality